James Francis Stewart (February 24, 1924 – December 22, 1995) was an American film and television actor. He was perhaps best known for playing Lieutenant Danton in the American soap opera television series Days of Our Lives from 1967 to 1981.

Bradley guest-starred in numerous television programs including Gunsmoke, The Fugitive, Tales of Wells Fargo, Perry Mason, Rawhide, Have Gun, Will Travel, Bat Masterson, The Life and Legend of Wyatt Earp, Iron Horse, It's a Living, Death Valley Days, The Virginian, Land of the Giants, I Dream of Jeannie, Jake and the Fatman, Maverick, The Adventures of Jim Bowie, McCloud, Highway to Heaven, The Detectives, The Restless Gun, Man Without a Gun, The Millionaire and Cannon. He died in December 1995 of a stroke in Cambria, California, at the age of 71.

Partial filmography 

The Burglar (1957) - Charlie
The Night God Screamed (1971) - Judge Coogan
Cool Breeze (1972) - Captain Lloyd Harmon
Another Nice Mess (1972) - Guilford

References

External links 

Rotten Tomatoes profile

1924 births
1995 deaths
People from Brooklyn
Male actors from New York (state)
American male film actors
American male television actors
American male soap opera actors
20th-century American male actors
Western (genre) television actors
Columbia University alumni